Errol D. Toulon Jr. (born July 20, 1962) is the 67th and current Sheriff of Suffolk County, New York on Long Island. Toulon is the first African American sheriff and first African American elected official to hold a "nonjudicial countywide office" in the history of Suffolk County. Sheriff Toulon was re-elected to a second term on November 2, 2021.

Early life and education 
Errol D. Toulon Jr. was raised in The Bronx, New York. His parents were Errol Sr., and Alma. His father was a deputy commissioner in the New York City Department of Corrections and his mother worked in education. In the late 1970s, "Junior" served for two years as a batboy for the New York Yankees.
He graduated from Cardinal Hayes High School and earned a Master of Business Administration degree at Dowling College in 2007. He went on to earn an Advanced Certificate in Homeland Security Management from Long Island University. Toulon completed his Doctorate in Educational Administration from Dowling College in 2011.  He also attended multiple leadership courses at the John F. Kennedy School of Government at Harvard University.

Suffolk County Sheriff 
With over 300,000 votes cast, Toulon was elected with 49.56% of the vote in 2017 in his bid for Suffolk County Sheriff, defeating challenger Larry Zacarese. On January 12, 2018 Sheriff Errol D. Toulon Jr. was sworn into office by New York Governor Andrew M. Cuomo. He became the first African-American elected to any nonjudicial countywide office in Suffolk County. As Sheriff, Toulon has focused on combating gangs and the opioid epidemic, implementing programs to fight recidivism, and providing access to community programs for Suffolk County residents.

Assistant Deputy County Executive for Suffolk County 
Toulon served as the Assistant Deputy County Executive for Public Safety under the administration of County Executive Steve Bellone. From this position, he oversaw 10,000 employees and an operating budget of $2.5 billion. the Suffolk County Police Department, Fire Rescue and Emergency Services, the Probation Department, the Medical Examiner's Office, and the Traffic and Parking Violations Agency.

As Assistant Deputy County Executive for Public Safety, Toulon reported and advised the County Executive on all matters of public safety and security issues. He was:

- A member of the Resolution Review Committee reviewing all resolutions from the Executive Branch of government

- Developed initiatives and policies within the Police and Probation Departments to combat heroin addiction and gang violence in the county

- Led the creation, implementation, and policy of the Suffolk County Traffic and Parking Violations Agency

- Created and managed new security procedures and surveillance systems in the H. Lee Dennison Building (Suffolk County government office building)

- Created initiatives to reduce recidivism and increase organizational accountability in the Probation Department

New York City Department of Corrections 
Toulon spent 22 years as a uniformed Member of Service with the New York City Department of Correction at Riker’s Island, where he served as a supervisor and instructor at the Correction Academy, the Firearms and Tactics Unit, Emergency Service Unit and Office of Compliance Consultants.

In July 2014, Toulon was named Deputy Commissioner of Operations for the New York City Department of Corrections. As Deputy Commissioner of Operations, he oversaw 10,000 employees (uniformed and civilian) and an operating budget of $1.8 billion. He acted as senior advisor to the commissioner on all aspects of operations and system improvements and directly supervised the department's Correction Academy, the Correction Intelligence Bureau, the Operations Security Intelligence Unit, the Fusion Center, the Office of Emergency Management, the Fire & Safety Unit, the Policies and Procedures Unit, the Nutritional Services Unit, the Environmental Health Unit, the Financial and Engineering Auditing Unit, PREA, and the Office of Policy Compliance. His main objective was focusing on improving management and strategy.

Chaplaincy program 
In April 2018, Toulon started a new chaplaincy program to assist in times of need for the Suffolk County Sheriff’s Office Staff.  The 10 Chaplains, from various religious faiths were sworn in at the Yaphank Correctional Facility.

According to the Suffolk County Sheriff's Office, the purpose of the Sheriff’s Chaplaincy Program is to provide interfaith emotional and spiritual counsel to Sheriff’s Office employees and their families during times of need and heightened stress.

The Volunteer Chaplains Program assists the Members of the Suffolk County Sheriff’s Office by providing the following services:

* Render spiritual guidance, aid in fostering personal growth, and offer moral support in crisis situations, in an atmosphere of understanding and confidentiality.

* Counsel and support sworn officers, civilian employees, and their family members, in personal matters and family difficulties, and provide referral resources when applicable.

* Visits to sick or injured officers in the hospital or at home when requested.

* Assist Sheriff’s Office personnel in making notifications to the families of officers who have been seriously injured, or upon the death of a member of the Sheriff’s Office.

* Participate in religious services for deceased members and offer support to the families of the deceased.

* Attend and offer prayers at official Sheriff’s Office functions:  i.e. Memorial Services, graduations, and award ceremonies, etc. All requests shall be coordinated through the Director of the Chaplains Program.

* When requested, assist Sheriff’s Office personnel (and Crisis Intervention Team) in emergency situations; e.g. multi-casualty incidents, officer shot or seriously injured, major disasters.

* In “emergency” situations an available "On Call" Chaplain can be reached (24 hours) by phone, through the Radio Office Supervisor.  In non-emergency situations members may call on any Chaplain of their choice or, according to one’s individual religious affiliation.

* Although Sheriff’s Office Chaplains are affiliated with various religious denominations, they serve as Chaplains to the whole department in an ecumenical –interfaith role, regardless of any individual’s religious tradition or lack thereof.

Senior Citizen Program POD 
The Suffolk County Sheriff’s Office has started a program that tries to fill the needs of older men jailed at the county correctional facility. The Senior Rehabilitation Pod Program is believed to be the first in the nation to segregate male inmates 50 and older from younger inmates to better concentrate on services more suited to the older inmates' needs. The program offers a wide range of services — everything from 12-step programs to employment counseling to mental health services — dedicated to improving the quality of older inmates’ lives while they are in jail and when they are released.

Paws of War 
The Suffolk County Sheriff’s Office partnered with Paws of War to have a Veteran Inmate work to train a rescue dog from Southampton Animal Shelter named Rocky. After 8 weeks of training, Rocky would be given to a Veteran “on the outside” who suffers from PTSD.

Project Lifesaver 
Project Lifesaver provides radio bracelets to people with cognitive impairments so that Sheriff's deputies and officers can locate them.

According to Project Lifesaver International, "the primary mission of Project Lifesaver is to provide timely response to save lives and reduce potential injury for adults and children with the propensity to wander due to a cognitive condition." The Suffolk County Sheriff's Office has dedicated Sheriff's Deputies who have been specially trained to use the high tech equipment to quickly locate lost individuals and bring them home safely

G.R.E.A.T. (Gang Resistance Education and Training) 
The Suffolk County Sheriff's Office teaches local students in Gang Resistance Education And Training (G.R.E.A.T.), a national program aimed at preventing bullying, drug use, violence and gangs in schools.

GREAT has reached more than 60,000 students in Suffolk since 2007. It is in 9 district and 51 Suffolk schools, including a few middle schools, which have a different, longer curriculum than in elementary schools.

The instruction of life skills is the foundation of the program. In accordance with a study by Dr. Esbensen in 2000, delinquency often serves as a precursor to gang involvement, the GREAT program the focuses on providing life skills to students to help them avoid delinquent behavior and resorting to violence to solve problems. Communities need not have a gang problem in order to benefit from the program as its primary objective is prevention and is intended as an immunization against delinquency, youth violence, and gang membership.

Y.E.S. (Youth Enlightenment Seminar) Tours 
In 1979 the Youth Enlightenment Seminar (YES) Tours were established at the Riverhead Correctional Facility. The Community Relations Unit of the Suffolk County Sheriff's Office, conducts the Y.E.S. Tours. Although the Sheriff's Office is interested in raising the consciousness of all Suffolk County youth regarding the realities of criminal behavior and imprisonment, the main target population is composed of those adolescents who are on the verge of becoming involved or becoming more deeply involved in criminal activity and criminal association.

As part of the program, the students receive a tour of the correctional facility and engage in a dialogue with a select group of inmates who have been involved in the system and are willing to share their experiences with the visiting youth.

According to the Community Relations Unit of the Suffolk County Sheriff's Office, the goals of the YES Tours are to help adolescents realize how easily antisocial criminal behavior can lead to prison, to offer support to parents, churches, and all those who are attempting to work with these adolescents, and to foster an awareness that only through work and education can life's most meaningful goals be accomplished.

In November 2018, The Yaphank Correctional Facility opened its doors to student tours for the first time in a Youth Enlightenment Seminar (YES) tour. The students toured the facility and had the opportunity speak with inmates about making good choices.

Choose to Thrive 
In December 2018, Toulon unveiled his Choose To Thrive Female Program Pod in the Yaphank Correctional Facility. The program uses a holistic approach to helping women behind bars get back into mainstream society. From trauma counseling to assistance for the inmates' children, the women are in a structured program where they can choose the courses or services they want.

This is the first program pod offered to the female general population.

Female inmates who were asked about programs in jail thought they were very helpful.  They said that programs in prison showed them a better way of life.

Deconstructing the Prison Pipeline 
In May 2019, Toulon and Assemblywoman Kimberly Jean-Pierre hosted a public hearing at Touro Law Center entitled “A Holistic Approach to Deconstructing the Prison Pipeline”. Speakers at this public hearing discussed the impact of parents' and family members' incarceration on children and siblings, how race and poverty feed the prison pipeline, childhood trauma and how it relates to delinquency in youth, and effective interventions. Acting Supreme Court Justice Fernando Camacho was present at this hearing, and made the case for "safe spaces" for children to receive "wraparound" services with job training, counseling, and recreational activities to help keep these kids from offending.

Many children who enter "the pipeline" are victims of poverty, abuse, or neglect.  They often act out in school and are suspended due to "zero tolerance" policies.  After being suspended, they end up being "pushed out" of the education system and end up in the correctional system, all stemming from a small in-school infraction, such as bringing nail clippers or scissors to school.  Deconstructing the Prison Pipeline believes that students should be educated, not incarcerated.

Sheriff Toulon spoke to Greater Bay Shore about the task force. “Deconstructing the prison pipeline is about mobilizing all facets of the community to prevent juvenile delinquency and crime,” said Toulon. “It’s about implementing practical prevention and intervention solutions that will improve people’s lives and make our communities safer.”

Inmates who were at the Deconstructing the Prison Pipeline conference spoke positively of their experiences in jail, saying that the programs they were involved in while incarcerated showed them a better way of life. but they also said that had there been some kind of intervention earlier while they were in school they could have altered the path that led to their incarceration in the first place.

Personal 
Toulon is a two time cancer survivor, having been diagnosed with Hodgkin's lymphoma in 1996 and with pancreatic cancer in 2003. His first wife, Susan, died after 29 years of marriage. They had two children, including Justin, who works in film and television in Georgia. Errol was married in 2016 to Tina whom he met after Susan's death.

References 

1962 births
People from Suffolk County, New York
African-American sheriffs
People from the Bronx
Living people
21st-century African-American people
20th-century African-American people